The following is a list of most watched Canadian television broadcasts of 2011 (single-network only) according to BBM Canada.

Most watched by week

References

Canadian television-related lists
2011 in Canadian television